Luis Simarro Lacabra (6 January 1851 – 19 June 1921) was a Spanish neurologist who was born in Rome while his parents were living in Italy.

Career 
He studied medicine in Valencia and Madrid, and in 1877 was appointed director of the Santa Isabel insane asylum at Leganés, outside of Madrid. From 1880 he lived in Paris and studied general anatomy and histology with Louis-Antoine Ranvier and clinical neurology under Jean Martin Charcot. Here he also came under the influence of philosopher Ernest Renan (1823–1892). anatomist Mathias-Marie Duval (1844–1907) and psychiatrist Valentin Magnan (1835–1916). In 1885 he returned to Madrid and opened a private practice, and in 1902 was appointed to the first chair of experimental psychology in Spain.

As a psychiatrist, Simarro was heavily influenced by developments in Germany, particularly Emil Kraepelin's classification and treatment of the insane, Wilhelm Wundt's theory of experimental psychology and Theodor Ziehen's critical analysis of Wundt's approach to psychology. 

Notwithstanding his work in psychiatry, Simarro is largely remembered for a contribution made in histology when he developed a silver bromide modification of Camillo Golgi's silver chromate technique. Famed Spanish histologist Ramon y Cajal recognized Simarro's achievement, and mentioned that it was a milestone that allowed him to abandon general histology and to focus on neurohistology.

Bibliography 
 Campos, J.J. (2006) Un día en el Arco de Santa María. In Santiago Ramón y Cajal, 100 años después  Eds. A. Ferrús y A. Gamundí. Madrid: Editorial Pirámide, pp. 62–92.
 Campos, J.J. (2006) Trayectoria y circunstancias de Cajal y Simarro. In Santiago Ramón y Cajal, 100 años después  Eds. A. Ferrús y A. Gamundí. Madrid: Editorial Pirámide, pp. 93–129.
 Campos, J.J. (2002) Luís Simarro y el origen de la Neurología en España. In Historia de la Neurología en España, Ed. A. Martín Araguz. Madrid: GlaxoSmithKline, pp. 119–127.
 Campos Bueno, JJ, (2010) Art and Science in Sorolla’s Painting A Research in Dr. Simarro’s Lab. Psychologia Latina, 1, 9–26
 Carpintero, H.,  Campos, J.J., Bandrés, J. (2002) Luís Simarro y la Psicología Científica en España. Cien Años de la cátedra de Psicología Experimental en la Universidad de Madrid, Madrid: Universidad Complutense.
 CMC (Carlos María Cortezo) (1921) Luis Simarro, Siglo Médico, 78: 616-617.
 Fernández-Galiano, D. (1994) Apuntes sobre la historia de la microscopía en España, Microbiología Sem., 10: 343-356.
 Kaplan, T. M. (1971a) Luis Simarro, Spanish histologist, Congreso nacional de historia de la medicina (Valencia 1969). Sociedad Española de Historia de la Medicina, 2: 523-533.
 Kaplan, T. M.. (1971b) Luis Simarro’s psychological theories, Congresso nacional de historia de la medicina (Valencia 1969). Sociedad Española de Historia de la Medicina, 2: 545-555.
 López Piñero, J. M. (1983) Diccionario histórico de la ciencia moderna en España, Barcelona: Península, pp. 327–330.
 Ramón y Cajal, S. (1937) Recollections of My Life, trans. E. H. Craigie, Philadelphia: American Philosophical Society, vol. 2, pp. 307–308.
 Simarro, L. (1881) Colegio de Francia: el curso de Anatomía General de Mr Ranvier, Boletín de la Institución Libre de Enseñanza, 5: 94-95.

References 
 Luis Simarro Lacabra [1851-1921]: From Golgi to Cajal through Simarro, via Ranvier published by Nieves Fernández and C. S. Breathnach in the Journal of the History of Neurosciences, 2001; 10: 19-26.;

External links 
 International Brain Research Organization (biography in English)
 Legado Luis Simarro (biography in Spanish)

1851 births
1921 deaths
Spanish psychiatrists
Spanish psychologists
Histologists
University of Valencia alumni
Complutense University of Madrid alumni
Academic staff of the Complutense University of Madrid